Stomphastis eugrapta is a moth of the family Gracillariidae. It is found in the regions of South Africa and Madagascar.

References

Stomphastis
Moths of Madagascar
Moths of Africa